Andrés Domínguez Candal aka Pierita (December 16, 1918  - October 24, 1978) was a Spanish footballer who played as a forward.

Football career
Pierita was a historic Elche CF player in the 1940s and 1950s and is the top scorer in the history of Elche with 123 goals in over 200 league games. These registers are managed at three different times in Elche in the second and third level. In Elche he achieved two promotions to the second level in seasons 1940–41 and 1948–49. His real reward came with the CD Alcoyano whom he played in La Liga in the 1950–51 season. He also played for the Orihuela Deportiva CF on the second level and CD Málaga in the second and third level.

References

External links
 

1918 births
Spanish footballers
Footballers from Santiago de Compostela
Association football forwards
La Liga players
Segunda División players
Elche CF players
CD Málaga footballers
CD Alcoyano footballers
Orihuela Deportiva CF footballers
1978 deaths